

Franz Landgraf (16 July 1888 – 19 April 1944) was a general in the Wehrmacht of Nazi Germany during World War II. He was a recipient of the Knight's Cross of the Iron Cross.

During the invasion of the Sovjet Union he led the 6th Panzer Division in the Baltic Region, fighting a battle at Raseiniai.

He died in Stuttgart on 19 April 1944.

Awards and decorations

 Knight's Cross of the Iron Cross on 16 June 1940 as Oberst and commander of 4. Panzer-Brigade

References

Citations

Bibliography

 

1888 births
1944 deaths
Military personnel from Munich
Lieutenant generals of the German Army (Wehrmacht)
German Army personnel of World War I
Recipients of the clasp to the Iron Cross, 1st class
People from the Kingdom of Bavaria
Recipients of the Knight's Cross of the Iron Cross
German Army generals of World War II